This article shows various estimates of the nuclear weapon stockpiles of various countries at various points in time. This article also shows the number of nuclear weapons tests conducted by each country at various points in time.

Nuclear weapons stockpiles

The United States nuclear stockpile increased rapidly from 1945, peaked in 1966, and declined after that. By 2012, the United States had several times fewer nuclear weapons than it had in 1966.

The Soviet Union developed its first nuclear weapon in 1949 and increased its nuclear stockpile rapidly until it peaked in 1986 under Mikhail Gorbachev. As Cold War tensions decreased, and after the collapse of the Soviet Union, the Soviet and Russian nuclear stockpile decreased by over 80% between 1986 and 2012.

The U.S. and Russian nuclear weapons stockpiles are projected to continue decreasing over the next decade.

The United Kingdom became a nuclear power in 1952, and its nuclear arsenal peaked at just under 500 nuclear weapons in 1981. France became a nuclear power in 1960, and French nuclear stockpiles peaked at just over 500 nuclear weapons in 1992. China developed its first nuclear weapon in 1964; its nuclear stockpile increased until the early 1980s, when it stabilized at between 200 and 260. India became a nuclear power in 1974, while Pakistan developed its first nuclear weapon in the 1980s. India and Pakistan currently have around one hundred nuclear weapons each. Pakistan's nuclear stockpile has increased rapidly, and it is speculated that Pakistan might have more nuclear weapons than the United Kingdom within a decade.

South Africa successfully built six nuclear weapons in the 1980s, but dismantled all of them in the early 1990s, shortly before the fall of the apartheid system. So far it is the only nuclear-capable country to give up nuclear weapons, although several members of the Soviet Union did so during the collapse of the Soviet regime.

North Korea joined the nuclear club in 2006 or before. A United States Defense Intelligence Agency report from 1999 projected that both Iran and Iraq would join the nuclear club and have 10-20 nuclear weapons in 2020. However, it is worth pointing out that this report was written before the overthrow of Iraqi dictator Saddam Hussein and before information was released indicating that Iraq had already given up its nuclear weapons program. Even before the U.S. started the nuclear club in 1945, some states (most notably Germany) unsuccessfully attempted to build nuclear weapons.

Nuclear weapon tests

From the first nuclear test in 1945, worldwide nuclear testing increased rapidly until the 1970s, when it peaked. However, there was still a large amount of worldwide nuclear testing until the end of the Cold War in the early 1990s. Afterwards, the Comprehensive Test Ban Treaty was signed and ratified by the major nuclear weapons powers, and the number of worldwide nuclear tests decreased rapidly. India and Pakistan conducted nuclear tests in 1998, but afterwards only North Korea conducted nuclear tests--in 2006, 2009, 2013, twice in 2016, and in 2017.

References

Nuclear weapons
Nuclear weapons policy
Nuclear proliferation
States With Nuclear Weapons
Cold War